is a city located in Ehime Prefecture, Japan. , the city had an estimated population of 33,276 in 15571 households and a population density of 160 persons per km². The city name may be romanized as 'Toon', 'Tôon'、'Tōon' or 'Tohon'.

Geography
Tōon is located in central Ehime Prefecture on the island of Shikoku. It is the only city in Ehime Prefecture that does not face the sea.  Located at the top of the alluvial fan of Dogo Plain, Toon is bordered on the east by Matsuyama, and with Saijō through a pass called Sakurasanri, with Kumakōgen to the south, and Imabari to the north. The Shigenobu River and its tributaries flow through the city, forming a small alluvial fan.

Neighbouring municipalities 
Ehime Prefecture
Matsuyama
 Saijō
Imabari
 Kumakōgen

Climate
Tōon has a Humid subtropical climate (Köppen Cfa) characterized by warm summers and cool winters with light snowfall.  The average annual temperature in Tōon is 13.9 °C. The average annual rainfall is 1770 mm with September as the wettest month. The temperatures are highest on average in January, at around 25.0 °C, and lowest in January, at around 2.8 °C.

Demographics
Per Japanese census data, the population of Tōon has been increasing steadily since the 1960s.

History 
The area of Tōon was part of ancient Iyo Province. During the Edo Period, the area was part of the holdings of Matsuyama Domain. Following the Meiji restoration, the are was organized into villages within Onsen District, Ehime. The village of Kawauchi was created by the merger of the villages of Kawakami (川上村) and Miuchi (三内村) on April 25,1955 and raised to town status on September 1, 1956. The town of Shigenobu was created on September 1, 1956 by the merger of the villages of Kitayoshii (北吉井村), Minamiyoshii (南吉井村) and Haishi (拝志村).  The city of Tōon was established on September 21, 2004, from the merger of the towns of [Kawauchi and Shigenobu.

Government
Tōon has a mayor-council form of government with a directly elected mayor and a unicameral city council of 15 members. Tōon contributes one member to the Ehime Prefectural Assembly. In terms of national politics, the city is part of Ehime 2nd district  of the lower house of the Diet of Japan.

Economy
Tōon has a mixed economy centered on agriculture and light manufacturing. Tt is also one of the leading production areas of barley in Japan, and other important crops include paddy rice, wheat, vegetables, flowers, and mandarin oranges. Industry includes electrical machinery and production machinery and food processing. Tōon has head office and production base of PHC, a subsidiary of PHC Holdings (formerly Matsushita Kotobuki Electronics Co., Ltd.), is located in the Sendai district, where blood sugar level measurement sensors and other products are manufactured. Due to its well-developed transportation network, industry is expanding, and the city is increasingly becoming a commuter town for neighboring Matsuyama.

Education
Tōon has seven public elementary schools and two public middle schools operated by the city government, and one public high school operated by the Ehime Prefectural Board of Education. The prefecture also operates two special education schools for the handicapped. The medical school of Ehime University is located in Tōon.

Transportation

Railways 
  Iyotetsu - Yokogawara Line
  -  -  -  -  -

Highways 
  Matsuyama Expressway

References

External links

 Tōon City official website 

Cities in Ehime Prefecture
Tōon, Ehime